Pur or PUR may refer to:

Arts, entertainment, and media
 Pur (band), a German band
 Pur, a song by the Cocteau Twins

People
 Necla Pur (born 1943), Turkish economist and professor
 Quraish Pur (1932–2013), Pakistani scholar, writer, and television host

Places

Villages
 Pur, Belgaum, Karnataka, India, a village
 Pur, Bhiwani, Haryana, India, a village
 Pur, Bhilwara, Rajasthan, India, a village
 Pur, Iran, a village

Rivers
 Pur (Russia), a river in Yamalo-Nenets, Russia
 Pur River (India), a river Gujarat, India

Other uses
 Pur (brand), a brand of water filters
 Pur (placename element), placename suffix used in South Asia
 Pacific Union Recorder, see List of Seventh-day Adventist periodicals
 Partidul Umanist Român (Romanian Humanist Party), former name of the Conservative Party (Romania)
 Polyurethane, a polymeric material

See also
 Purr, a sound made by felines